The European chafer (Amphimallon majale classified as Rhizotrogus majalis prior to Montreuil 2000) is a beetle of the family Scarabaeidae. Formerly found only in continental Europe, this invasive species is now found at temperate latitudes in North America. The large, white grubs of A. majale feed on the roots of most cool-latitude grasses, both wild and cultivated. This has made the European chafer an enemy of lawns.

Description

Imago
Their pronotum features a narrow band of light-yellow setae and the underside of the thorax has similar coloured setae. The tip of the abdomen protrudes beyond the wing covers. Wing covers have longitudinal grooves.

Larvae
Larvae are white-coloured and C-shaped, with a yellow-brown head and six jointed legs. The raster has two distinct rows of small spines that diverge outward at the tip of the abdomen.

Pupae and eggs
The pupae of the European chafer resemble those of the other turf-infesting scarab beetles, such as the Japanese beetle.

Life cycle

The European chafer has a 1-year life cycle. The imago, or adult beetle, stage is quite short, lasting 1–2 weeks. The adults come out of the ground in late spring and mate in large swarms, usually on low trees and shrubs. The beetles are most active on warm, clear nights when the temperature is above . They emerge at about 8:30 pm, mate through the night, and return to the soil by daybreak. Beetles may return to the trees to re-mate several times over the mating period. Late in the period, the adult carcasses may litter the ground beneath trees used for swarming.

Female chafers lay 20-40 eggs over their lifespan. The grubs hatch by late July. The grub population consists mainly of first instars in early- to mid-August, second instars by early September, and third instars by mid-September to early October. In frost zones, the grubs feed until November, then move deeper into the soil. In frost-free areas, the larva will feed all winter. Vigorous feeding occurs from March through May. The pre-pupal and pupal stages last 2–4 days and 2 weeks, respectively. By June, the new beetles begin emerging.

Lawn destruction
The damage caused by chafer infestation to residential lawns is exacerbated by the fact that its grubs are an attractive food source for local fauna such as crows, skunks and raccoons, who relentlessly dig up the turf in search of the morsels. Homeowners often find themselves bewildered by the speed and extent of the destruction which may ensue.

References

Montreuil, O. 2000. Cladistic systematics of the genus Amphimallon (Coleoptera: Scarabaeidae: Melolonthinae). European Journal of Entomology 97: 253–270.
Potter, Daniel A. Destructive Turfgrass Insects: Biology, Diagnosis, And Control, Ann Arbor Press, Michigan, 1998

Amphimallon
Beetles of Europe
Beetles described in 1789
Invasive agricultural pests